"Scarlet Ribbons (For Her Hair)" is a popular folk style ballad. The music was written by Evelyn Danzig and the lyrics by Jack Segal. The song has become a standard with many recorded versions and has appeared on several Christmas albums.

Background and lyrics
"Scarlet Ribbons" was written in only 15 minutes in 1949 at Danzig's home in Port Washington, New York after she invited lyricist Segal to hear her music. The song tells a miraculous tale: a father hears his small daughter pray before she goes to bed for "scarlet ribbons for her hair". It is late, no stores are open in their town, nor is there anywhere the dad can obtain the ribbons so he is distraught throughout the night. At dawn he again peeps in and is amazed to see beautiful "scarlet ribbons" in "gay profusion lying there."  He says that if he lives to be two hundred, he will never know from where the ribbons came.

Renditions

Jo Stafford
"Scarlet Ribbons" was first released by Jo Stafford in 1949. In January 1950, Stafford's version reached No. 14 on Billboards chart of "Records Most Played by Disc Jockeys".

Harry Belafonte
In 1952 Harry Belafonte, at his third session for RCA Records, covered the song with an arrangement using his guitarist Millard Thomas and male vocal group. The four-year-old recording finally became a success in 1956 after it appeared on his second album, which reached No. 1 on Billboards album chart for six weeks and stayed on the chart for over a year. The song reached No. 18 on the UK's New Musical Express chart in late 1957.

The Browns
In 1959, the Browns released what would become the most successful version of "Scarlet Ribbons" in the US. The Browns' version spent 14 weeks on the Billboard Hot 100, reaching No. 13 on January 2, 1960, while reaching No. 7 on Billboards Hot C&W Sides.

Cliff Richard
In 1991, Cliff Richard released the song on his Christmas album Together with Cliff Richard, and as a single. The song reached No. 19 on the New Zealand Singles Chart and No. 51 in Germany.

References

1949 songs
Jo Stafford songs
Joan Baez songs
The Kingston Trio songs
The Browns songs
Cliff Richard songs
American Christmas songs
Glen Campbell songs
Songs written by Jack Segal
Song recordings produced by Chet Atkins
Sinéad O'Connor songs
RCA Victor singles